Mosser is a village and former civil parish,  south west of Carlisle, now in the parish of Blindbothel, in Allerdale district, in the county of Cumbria, England. In 1931 the parish had a population of 56. Mosser has a church called St Michael's Church.

History 
The name "Mosser" means 'Moss shieling', in the sense of a peat bog. Mosser was formerly a township and chapelry in the parish of Brigham, from 1866 Mosser was a civil parish in its own right until 1 April 1934 when it was abolished and merged with Blindbothel. On 28 February 2018 there was a 3.2 magnitude earthquake of which Mosser was at the epicentre.

References

External links 
 Cumbria County History Trust: Mosser (nb: provisional research only – see Talk page)

Villages in Cumbria
Former civil parishes in Cumbria
Allerdale